Huxlow Academy is a secondary school and sixth form with academy status, located in Irthlingborough, Northamptonshire, England. Previously a specialist Science College, the school converted to academy status in April 2012. However, the name only changed to Huxlow Academy in late 2022.There are just over 900 students on roll, including around 100 students in the Sixth Form, which is shared with two other local schools.

It was founded in 1962 and was originally known as Finedon and Irthlingborough Secondary Modern School.

The current Head Teacher is Mr Paul Letch. He joined the school in September 2021. 
There are 47 teachers (full-time equivalent) and 36 support staff.

Feeder School
The school gains its Year 7 students from primary schools in Irthlingborough, Finedon, Little Addington, Great Addington and Woodford as well as numerous schools in surrounding villages.

Sixth form provision
The Sixth Form is part of The East Northamptonshire College (TENC), which combines the strengths of Huxlow Academy, The Ferrers School and The Rushden Academy at post-16 level.

Achievement
In the school's Ofsted report in 2016 the College was deemed to be "Good" in all main areas (achievement, quality of teaching, behaviour and leadership/management).

Percentage of students achieving 5+ GCSEs including Maths and English 
2012: 59%
2013: 57%
2014: 54%
2015: 48%

References

External links
Huxlow Academy website

Secondary schools in North Northamptonshire
1962 establishments in England
Educational institutions established in 1962
Academies in North Northamptonshire